War Zone is the second album by American hip hop trio Black Moon. It was released on February 23, 1999 through Duck Down/Priority Records. Recording sessions took place at D&D Studios in New York City. Production was entirely handled by Da Beatminerz, who also served as executive producers together with Drew "Dru-Ha" Friedman and member Buckshot. It features guest appearances from Busta Rhymes, Heather B., Louieville Sluggah, M.O.P., Q-Tip, Rock, Smif-N-Wessun and Teflon. The album peaked at number 35 on the Billboard 200 and number 9 on the Top R&B Albums. It was supported by two singles: "Two Turntables & a Mic" and "Worldwind (This Is What It Sounds Like) (Remix)".

The album was released almost six years after its influential debut Enta da Stage. The group began a lengthy legal battle with Nervous Records in 1995 over the licensing of their name, which finally settled soon before the release of War Zone. Though many of the albums released from the Boot Camp Clik family between 1997 and 1999 received mediocre reviews, War Zone garnered some strong acclaim and moderate sales. Member 5ft, who only appeared on three tracks on Enta da Stage, provides verses on six songs.

Track listing

Sample credits
Track 2 contains a sample from "How Do Yeaw View You?" written by George Clinton, William Collins and Bernard Worrell
Track 4 contains a sample from "The Day" written by Manos Hadjidakis and Brian Corrigan
Track 5 contains a sample from "N.T." written by Kool & the Gang and "Dead On It Part II" written by James Brown and Fred Wesley
Track 12 contains a sample from "A Divine Image" written by David Axelrod
Track 15 contains a sample from "Heartbeat" written by Kenton Nix
Track 17 contains a sample from "General Confessional" written by Danvid Axelrod
Track 18 contains a sample from "We People Who Are Darker Than Blue" written by Curtis Mayfield

Personnel
Black Moon
Kenyatta "Buckshot" Blake – main artist, lead vocals, executive producer, liner notes
Kaseem "5ft" Reid – main artist, vocals (tracks: 3, 6, 7, 9, 12, 16), liner notes
Ewart "DJ Evil Dee" Dewgrade – main artist, scratches, producer, executive producer, liner notes

Guest musicians
Trevor "Busta Rhymes" Smith – featured artist (track 2)
Heather B. Gardner – featured artist (track 7)
Barret "Louieville Sluggah" Powell – featured artist (track 8)
Jonathan "Q-Tip" Davis – featured artist (track 11)
Darrell "Steele" Yates, Jr. – featured artist (track 13)
Tekomin "Tek" Williams – featured artist (track 13)
Jamal "Lil' Fame" Grinnage – featured artist (track 16)
Eric "Billy Danze" Murray – featured artist (track 16)
Linwood "Teflon" Starling – featured artist (track 16)
Jahmal "Rock" Bush – featured artist (track 19)
Mark "Boogie" Brown – bass (track 5), guitar (track 8)
Dana "Rockwilder" Stinson – keyboards & co-producer (track 18)

Technical
Walter "Mr. Walt" Dewgarde – producer, executive producer, liner notes
Paul "Baby Paul" Hendricks – producer
Drew "Dru-Ha" Friedman – executive producer
Kieran Walsh – mixing (tracks: 2, 3, 5, 7, 8, 11, 13, 16-18), recording (tracks: 2, 7, 17, 18)
Leo "Swift" Morris – mixing (tracks: 4, 5, 9, 11, 12, 15, 16), recording (tracks: 4, 8, 9, 11-13, 15)
Dejuana Richardson – recording (tracks: 3, 5)
Almitra – recording (tracks: 6, 14)
Cynical Smith – recording (tracks: 6, 14)
Donovan McCoy – recording (track 16)
Thomas Coyne – mastering
Kevin Bergen – assistant engineering
Tramp And Huy – art direction

Charts

Singles chart positions

References

External links

1999 albums
Duck Down Music albums
Priority Records albums
Black Moon (group) albums
Albums produced by Da Beatminerz